Churchill Show (formerly Churchill Live) is a Kenyan comedy show hosted by comedian Daniel "Churchill" Ndambuki, that premiered on 2007 on the network NTV. It is recorded live at Carnivore grounds in Nairobi.

Churchill Raw
A 30-minute show and subsidiary of Churchill Show. It is hosted by comedian MC Jesse. The series often airs content that may not air on Churchill Show.

Comedians
 Eric Omondi (comedian)
 Felix Omondi
 MC Jessie
 Chipukeezy
 Fred Omondi
 Karis (comedian)' 
 YY (Oliver Otieno)
 Janyando Mig Mig
 Owago Onyiro
 Poet Teardrops
 Teacher Wanjiku
 Eddie Butita
 Alex Mungahi
 Mammito Eunice
 Steven Oduor

Kenya broadcast 
Churchill Show (then:Churchill Live) premiered on NTV (Kenya) in 2007 and continued until late 2009. The series returned for a second season on January 17, 2013. It originally aired Thursdays at 8 p.m. EAT, but was later moved to Sundays at 8 p.m. , in its fifth season, it was the network's most viewed show and one of the most watched in East Africa. It is also broadcast in East Africa in StarTimes syndicate channel StarTimes Swahili.

References

External links

2007 Kenyan television series debuts
Kenyan comedy television series
English-language television shows
Swahili-language television shows
2000s Kenyan television series
NTV (Kenyan TV channel) original programming